Glyptoria is a genus of protorthid brachiopod with a ventral spondylium. It is characterized by a free apical plate in the ventral valve interior and a distinctive coarse, lamellose ornament.

References

Rhynchonellata